The 2008 Women's European Water Polo Championship was the twelve edition of the  bi-annual event, organised by the Europe's governing body in aquatics, the Ligue Européenne de Natation. The event took place in the Aquatic Centre Málaga in Málaga, Spain from July 5 to July 12, 2008.

Teams

Group A

Group B

Preliminary round

Group A

July 5, 2008

July 6, 2008

July 7, 2008

Group B

July 5, 2008

July 6, 2008

July 7, 2008

Quarterfinals
July 8, 2008

Semifinals
July 10, 2008

Finals

7 / 8 places
July 8, 2008

5 / 6 places
July 10, 2008

Bronze Medal
July 12, 2008

Gold Medal
July 12, 2008

Final ranking

Valentina Vorontsova, Natalia Shepelina, Ekaterina Prokofyeva, Sofia Konoukh, Alena Vylegzhanina, Nadezda Glyzina, Ekaterina Pantyulina, Evgenia Soboleva, Oleksandra Karpovich, Olga Belyaeva, Elena Smurova, Olga Turova, Evgeniya ProtsenkoHead coach: Alexander Kleymenov.

Individual awards
Most Valuable Player

Best Goalkeeper
Topscorer
 (16)

References
 Official site
LEN website

Women
Women's European Water Polo Championship
International water polo competitions hosted by Spain
Women's water polo in Spain
E
W
July 2008 sports events in Europe